Fuck The War is an EP by Angry Samoans.

Track listing
"Election Day" - 1:45 (M. Saunders)
"Gas Chamber" - 1:02 (M. Saunders/G. Turner)
"Letter To Uncle Sam" - 1:06 (M. Saunders)
"Let's Burn The Flag" - 1:50 (M. Saunders)
"Rat and Captain Talk Philosophy with Kickface" - 11:39
"Daisy I'll Be Missing You" - 2:25 (T. Daddy)
"WLVR Radio Spot" - 0:46

Personnel
"Metal Mike" Saunders - vocals, guitar, drums
Alison "Wonderslam" Victor - guitar, bass
Julia Altstatt - bass
Bill Vockeroth - drums

2006 EPs
Angry Samoans albums
Bad Trip Records EPs
Triple X Records EPs